Cursive script (sōshotai; , choseo), often mistranslated as grass script, is a script style used in Chinese and East Asian calligraphy. It is an umbrella term for the cursive variants of the clerical script and the regular script.

The cursive script functions primarily as a kind of shorthand script or calligraphic style; it is faster to write than other styles, but can be difficult to read for those unfamiliar with it due to its abstraction and alteration of character structures. People who can only read standard or printed forms of Chinese or related scripts may have difficulty reading the cursive script.

Names
However,  can be extended to mean hurried or rough, from which the name  came. Thus, the name of this script is literally "draft script", "quick script" or "rough script" (the character   means script in this context).

History
Cursive script originated in China through two phases during the period from the Han to Jin dynasties. Firstly, an early form of cursive developed as a cursory way to write the popular but hitherto immature clerical script. Faster ways to write characters developed through four mechanisms: omitting part of a graph, merging strokes together, replacing portions with abbreviated forms (such as one stroke to replace four dots), or modifying stroke styles. This evolution can best be seen on extant bamboo and wooden slats from the period, on which the use of early cursive and immature clerical forms is intermingled. This early form of cursive script, based on clerical script, is now called , and variously also termed ancient cursive, draft cursive or clerical cursive in English, to differentiate it from modern cursive. Modern cursive evolved from this older cursive in the Wei Kingdom to Jin dynasty with influence from the semi-cursive and standard styles.

Styles
Besides  and "modern cursive," there is also "wild cursive" which is even more cursive and difficult to read. When it was developed by Zhang Xu and Huaisu in the Tang dynasty, they were called  (crazy Zhang and drunk Su, 顛張醉素). Cursive, in this style, is no longer significant in legibility but rather in artistry.

Cursive scripts can be divided into the unconnected style where each character is separate, and the connected style where each character is connected to the succeeding one.

Derived characters
Many simplified Chinese characters are derived from the standard script rendition of their corresponding cursive form, e.g. 书, 东.

Cursive script forms of Chinese characters are also the origin of the Japanese hiragana script. Specifically, hiragana developed from cursive forms of the man'yōgana script, called .

Notable calligraphers

Huaisu
Wang Xizhi
Wang Xianzhi
Wen Zhengming
Yu Youren
Zhang Zhi, sage of Cursive Script
Zhang Xu

References

The Art of Japanese Calligraphy, 1973, author Yujiro Nakata, publisher Weatherhill/Heibonsha, .
Qiu Xigui Chinese Writing (2000). Translation of 文字學概要 by Gilbert L. Mattos and Jerry Norman. Early China Special Monograph Series No. 4. Berkeley: The Society for the Study of Early China and the Institute of East Asian Studies, University of California, Berkeley. .

External links
Cursive script/grass script calligraphy generator

Chinese characters
Chinese script style
East Asian calligraphy
Logographic writing systems
Writing systems